Tompkins is a village in the Canadian province of Saskatchewan within the Rural Municipality of Gull Lake No. 139 and Census Division No. 8. The village is on the Trans-Canada Highway between the Town of Maple Creek and the City of Swift Current. The village was named for Thomas Tompkins, a CPR railroad contractor.

History 
Tompkins incorporated as a village on June 2, 1910.

Demographics 

Economy 
Tompkins has several small businesses which thrive on the local shopping and dedication which have always been an asset to the citizens of Tompkins.

Popular culture
Tompkins' most famous celebrity was Gus Wickstrom who was known worldwide, and was featured on such programmes as the Daily Show, numerous Canada-wide TV shows, and various other USA TV and radio shows. He predicted the weather by looking at raw pig spleens for their colour, width, length and fatty deposits.  From this, he predicted temperature, extreme heat/cold periods, snow/rainfall and drought up to eight months in advance. This is a famous practice dating back to his Scandinavian heritage. Gus died in 2007.

The popular Canadian sit-com Corner Gas pays tribute to both Gus Wickstrom and Tompkins in having the publisher/editor/writer of the local newspaper The Howler named Gus Tompkins. The character, though often talked about, is never seen.

References

External links

Villages in Saskatchewan
Gull Lake No. 139, Saskatchewan
Division No. 8, Saskatchewan